Kamel Mouassa (born 6 February 1950) is an Algerian football manager.

References

1950 births
Living people
Algerian football managers
ASM Oran managers
MC El Eulma managers
JS Kabylie managers
DRB Tadjenanet managers
USM Annaba managers
Algerian Ligue Professionnelle 1 managers
21st-century Algerian people